Trioceros balebicornutus, the  Bale two-horned chameleon, is a species of chameleon. It is endemic to the Bale Mountains, central Ethiopia.

References

Trioceros
Reptiles of Ethiopia
Endemic fauna of Ethiopia
Reptiles described in 1998
Taxa named by Colin R. Tilbury